The Innocents is a 1963 Argentine-Spanish drama film written and directed by Juan Antonio Bardem. It was entered into the 13th Berlin International Film Festival. The film was shot in the Argentinian city of Mar del Plata, and tells the love story of a young, innocent woman, Elena Ezzquelia, and an older, brokenhearted man, Guido Santroti. Young Elena comes from a rich family, who immediately refused to her having a relationship with Guido, who was just a middle-class man, according to them.

Cast
 Alfredo Alcón as Guido Santrori
 Paloma Valdés as Elena Ezzquellia
 Enrique Fava as Ignazio Fuentes
 Zelmar Gueñol as Leiva Fuentes
 Lía Casanova as Natalia Ezzquellia
 Eduardo Muñoz as Dionisio Ezzquellia

References

External links
 

1963 films
1960s Spanish-language films
1963 drama films
Argentine black-and-white films
Spanish black-and-white films
Films directed by Juan Antonio Bardem
1960s Argentine films
1960s Spanish films